The Longest Year is an EP by Swedish band Katatonia, released in 2010 by Peaceville Records.

Background 
The EP features the title track originally released on Katatonia's eighth studio album Night Is the New Day, and the previously unreleased track "Sold Heart". The videos for "The Longest Year" and "Day & Then the Shade" were directed by Charlie Granberg and Lasse Hoile, respectively. The versions of "Day & Then the Shade" and "Idle Blood" are remixed versions of songs that previously appeared on their full-length album preceding this release, Night is the New Day.

Track listing

References

2010 EPs
Katatonia EPs